The Church of the Holy Family, also known as Capilla Jackson, is a Roman Catholic parish church in the neighbourhood of Aires Puros, Montevideo, Uruguay.

History
The temple was built as a private chapel for the Jackson family; designed by French architect Víctor Rabú in Neo-Gothic style, it was the edifice religious was built and consecrated in the year 1870. Currently it is a parish church held by the Jesuits.

The parish was established on 16 April 1961. In 1975 it was declared a National Historical Monument.

The remains of businessman Juan D. Jackson are buried here.

References

External links

1961 establishments in Uruguay
Roman Catholic churches completed in 1870
Roman Catholic church buildings in Montevideo
Jesuit churches in Uruguay
Gothic Revival church buildings in Uruguay
19th-century Roman Catholic church buildings in Uruguay